Walter Alvarez (born October 3, 1940) is a professor in the Earth and Planetary Science department at the University of California, Berkeley. He is most widely known for the theory that dinosaurs were killed by an asteroid impact, developed in collaboration with his father, Nobel Prize–winning physicist Luis Alvarez.

Biography
Born in Berkeley, California, Alvarez is the son of Luis Walter Alvarez, a Nobel prize-winner in physics, and Geraldine Smithwick. His grandfather was the famed physician Walter C. Alvarez and his great-grandfather, Spanish-born Luis F. Alvarez, worked as a doctor in Hawaii and developed a method for the better diagnosis of macular leprosy. His great-aunt Mabel Alvarez was a noted California artist and oil painter.

Alvarez earned his B.A. in geology in 1962 from Carleton College in Minnesota and Ph.D. in geology from Princeton University in 1967. He worked for American Overseas Petroleum Limited in the Netherlands, and in Libya at the time of Colonel Gaddafi's revolution.  Having developed a side interest in archaeological geology, he left the oil company and spent some time in Italy, studying the Roman volcanics and their influence on patterns of settlement in early Roman times.

Alvarez then moved to Lamont–Doherty Geological Observatory of Columbia University, and began studying the Mediterranean tectonics in the light of the new theory of plate tectonics.  His work on tectonic paleomagnetism in Italy led to a study of the geomagnetic reversals recorded in Italian deep-sea limestones. Alvarez and his colleagues were able to date the reversals for an interval of more than 100 million years of the Earth's history by using Foraminifera biostratigraphy.

Impact theory

Alvarez and his father Luis W. Alvarez are most widely known for their discovery (with Frank Asaro and Helen Michel) that a clay layer occurring right at the Cretaceous–Paleogene (K-Pg) boundary was highly enriched in the element iridium. Since iridium enrichment is common in asteroids, but very uncommon on the Earth, they further postulated that the layer had been created by the impact of a large asteroid with the Earth and that this impact was the likely cause of the Cretaceous–Paleogene extinction event.

This iridium enrichment has now been observed in many other sites around the world. In addition, the immense Chicxulub crater off the northeast coast of the Yucatan Peninsula was identified and is now regarded as the definitive evidence of a large impact, and perhaps the cause of the event. Consequently, a majority of scientists now accept an impact scenario as the most likely cause for the Cretaceous–Paleogene extinction which occurred 66 million years ago and was responsible for the elimination of 75% of all then-existent species, including all non-avian dinosaurs.  His book, T. Rex and the Crater of Doom, details the discovery of the event.

In addition to his interest in extinction events and impacts, Alvarez has contributed to the understanding of Mediterranean tectonics, Roman geology and archeology, and the establishment of magnetostratigraphic correlations.

Big History

Alvarez began teaching a course in Big History at UC Berkeley in 2006 under the title "Big History: Cosmos, Earth, Life, Humanity." He last taught the course in 2011 where it was videotaped and made freely available online. According to Alvarez, Big History is the "attempt to understand, in a unified and interdisciplinary way, the history of the Cosmos, Earth, Life and Humanity." This definition was later adopted by the International Big History Association (IBHA). Alvarez's course is open to all majors and grade levels and seeks to provide a broad understanding of the past, present and future.

Alvarez helped organize a meeting of Big Historians at the Geological Observatory at Coldigioco in Italy in 2010 which resulted in the establishment of the International Big History Association. In 2011, the IBHA is a 501(c)3 non-profit organization.

Alvarez was one of the founding members of the IBHA, and served on the advisory board until August 7, 2014 when he stepped down at the 2014 IBHA conference held at Dominican University of California.

ChronoZoom

Alvarez's most recent contribution to the field of Big History has been the creation of a free, open source, zoomable timeline in partnership with Microsoft Research called ChronoZoom. ChronoZoom is a computer-graphical approach to dealing with this problem of visualizing and understanding time scales, and presenting vast quantities of historical information in a useful way. ChronoZoom was introduced at the 97th Annual Faculty Research Lecture at UC Berkeley.

Awards and honors

Alvarez is the recipient of numerous awards and honors. He was elected a Fellow of the American Academy of Arts and Sciences in 1983, and elected a member of the National Academy of Sciences in 1991. He was awarded the 2006 Nevada Medal, the 2008 Vetlesen Prize, and the Penrose Medal from the Geological Society of America. In 2005, he received the doctorate "Honoris Causa" in Geological Sciences from the University of Siena, Italy.

Minor planet 3581 Alvarez is named after him and his father, Luis Walter Alvarez.

Works
T. Rex and the Crater of Doom (Princeton University Press, 1997) 
The Mountains of Saint Francis: The Geologic Events that Shaped Our Earth (W. W. Norton, December 2008) 
A Most Improbable Journey: A Big History of our Planet and Ourselves (W. W. Norton, 2016)

References

External links
Walter Alvarez's Berkeley homepage
ChronoZoom project homepage

1940 births
Members of the United States National Academy of Sciences
Living people
American geologists
Carleton College alumni
University of California, Berkeley College of Letters and Science faculty
Big History
Penrose Medal winners
Princeton University alumni
Columbia University faculty
People from Berkeley, California
American people of Asturian descent
American people of Spanish descent
Fellows of the American Academy of Arts and Sciences
Barringer Medal winners